Andrew McLean (born 20 July 1969) is a former professional tennis player from Australia.

Biography
McLean, who grew up in Victoria, made two appearances in the main draw of the Australian Open.

At the 1989 Australian Open he teamed up with regular doubles partner Andrew Florent as a wildcard pairing in the men's doubles. They were beaten in the first round by Guy Forget and Jakob Hlasek but managed to take a set off the sixth seeds.

Having fallen in singles qualifying every year from 1988 to 1992, he was granted a wildcard into the main draw of the 1993 Australian Open, where he lost in the opening round to Fabrice Santoro.

References

External links
 
 

1969 births
Living people
Australian male tennis players
Tennis people from Victoria (Australia)